The Method (Russian: Метод) is a Russian crime drama television series, produced by Sreda, starring Konstantin Khabensky and Paulina Andreeva.

The first episode aired on Channel One October 18, 2015. Principal photography was done in Nizhny Novgorod.

The second season began November 8, 2020 on Channel One.

Plot 
The series centers on Rodion Meglin (Konstantin Khabensky), a highest level investigator of the Russian police who is also a sanctioned vigilante, hunting down the criminally insane ("maniacs" in Russian) who slip through the cracks of an ill-suited justice system. He’s used to working alone, never revealing the secrets of his method. A young law school graduate, Esenia Steklova (Paulina Andreeva), is assigned to the department of the Investigative Committee where Meglin serves, becoming his trainee. Esenia has personal motives for working with the famous investigator - her mother was killed under mysterious circumstances, while her father hides key details of what happened. She’s given up hope of finding the murderer, but wants to learn as much as she can from the seasoned investigator. Throughout the series, Esenia encounters unexpected challenges working with Meglin.

Cast
Konstantin Khabensky — Rodion Meglin
Paulina Andreeva — Esenia Steklova
Alexander Petrov — Zhenya
Makar Zaporozhskiy - Sasha
Alexander Tsekalo — "Festive Killer"
Yekaterina Dubakina — Ania Zakharova
Zakhar Kabanov — Pasha Orlov
Timofey Tribuntsev — Kolya
Valentin Samokhin — Andrey Zhukov
Sergei Belyaev — Egorov
Yan Tsapnik — Zhora
Ivan Dobronravov — Pavlik Tolmachyov
Aleksei Serebryakov — Anufriev
Vitali Kishchenko — Andrey Steklov, Esenia's father
Yuri Kolokolnikov — Michael Ptaha
Sergey Sosnovsky — Vadim Bergich, psychiatrist  
 Kirill Polukhin — Egor Alexandrovich Bykov ("Gray"), detective  
 Yuri Bykov - "Thin", detective  
 Igor Savochkin — Vyacheslav (the kidnapper of the girls "Summer resident")  
 Yevgeniya Simonova — Sofya Zinovievna, teacher

Production
The creators of the Russian TV series reject the similarities of their work with the American TV show Dexter, but do confirm some commonality with the True Detective series.

Awards
The series won three awards at TEFI in 2016;
Best television film / TV series
Best actor in a television film / series (Konstantin Khabensky)
Best television producer of the season (Alexander Tsekalo for select episodes).

References

External links 

Russian crime television series
2010s Russian television series
2015 Russian television series debuts
2015 Russian television series endings
Russian-language television shows
Serial drama television series
Television shows set in Moscow
Russian police procedural television series
Russian horror fiction television series
Russian workplace drama television series
Television series by Sreda
Channel One Russia original programming
Films directed by Yuri Bykov
Television shows filmed in Moscow
Films shot in Nizhny Novgorod
Fictional portrayals of police departments in Russia
Vigilante television series
Police procedurals